Hesperia is a city in San Bernardino County, California, United States. Because of its relatively high elevation and the unique and moderate weather patterns of the region, Hesperia is part of what is locally called the High Desert. The name "Hesperia" means "western land". The 2019 census report estimates that the city has a population of 95,750.

History

The first inhabitants of the area were the Desert Serrano (Vanyume). The village of Wá’peat, among several other villages that were located along the Mojave River, were within the vicinity of what is now Hesperia. These villages were occupied into the early 1800s and had deep ties with one another. An acorn-gathering festival was held at Wá’peat that involved villagers from across the Mojave River area.

Hesperia began as a Spanish land grant: Rancho San Felipe, Las Flores y el Paso del Cajon, founded in 1781. The land was sparsely inhabited desert during Spanish-Mexican rule in the 19th century. The U.S. annexed the region along with Southern California after the Mexican-American War in 1848.

In 1869, Max Stobel purchased  from the United States Government Land Office for $40,000.  While several attempts were made to subdivide and encourage colonization, the land was primary used for agricultural purposes, with raisin grapes the primary product.

The town site was laid out in 1891 by railroad company land developers of the Santa Fe Railroad, which was completed that year. Hesperia was named for Hesperus, the Greek god of the West. The railroad land developers published pamphlets distributed across the country with boosterism of Hesperia, California, as a potential metropolis, to become "the Omaha of the West" or projections to have over 100,000 people by 1900, but only 1,000 moved in.

Hesperia grew relatively slowly until the completion of US Routes 66, 91, and 395 in the 1940s, followed by Interstate 15 in the late 1960s. About  of land were laid out for possible residential development.

In the early 1950s, land developer M. Penn Phillips and his silent financial partner, boxer Jack Dempsey, financed the building of roads and land subdivisions, promoting lots sales on television. They built the Hesperia Inn and golf course, which attracted a variety of Hollywood celebrities. The Hesperia Inn also housed the Jack Dempsey Museum.

The main wave of newcomers, though, arrived at Hesperia in the 1980s. Suburban growth transformed the small town of 5,000 people in 1970 to a moderate-sized city with a population over 60,000 by 2000, and an estimated population over 95,000 as of July 1, 2018.

Geography

Hesperia is a city in the Mojave Desert, and the California Aqueduct traverses the area. Much of the native flora of Hesperia is classified as California desert vegetation, dominated by junipers, joshua trees, and sagebrush.

The San Andreas Fault, a major tectonic plate boundary of the Pacific and North American plates a few miles south of Hesperia in the Cajon Pass, has occasional seismic activity.

The Mojave River flows northerly through the east side of the city, while the California Aqueduct splits the city from north to south en route to Silverwood Lake.

On the southern edge of Hesperia, where the city meets the desert by the airport to the east, is a somewhat pronounced mesa.

Climate
According to the Köppen climate classification, Hesperia has a cold desert climate, BWk on climate maps.

It is also the area's wet season. The rain shadow caused by the mountain ranges to the south and west shields Hesperia from the majority of winter rainfall, but heavy rain is not uncommon. Winter snowfall is sporadic - the average yearly snowfall amount is 4.4 inches.

Summer days are very hot, with high temperatures typically nearing . This excessive heat is typical of the Mojave Desert as a whole. The large diurnal temperature variation, though, provides substantial relief overnight. In the later part of the season, sporadic summer thunderstorms associated with the North American monsoon can bring power outages and local flash floods.

Demographics

2000
As of the 2000 census  62,582 people, 19,966 households, and 15,773 families were living in the city. The population density was 929.3 inhabitants per square mile (358.8/km). The 21,348 housing units  averaged 317.0 per square mile (122.4/km).  The racial makeup of the city was 74.3% White, 4.0% African American, 1.3% Native American, 1.1% Asian, 0.2% Pacific Islander, 6.5% from other races, and 4.7% from two or more races. Hispanics or Latinos of any race were 29.4% of the population.

Of the 19,966 households, 42.6% had children under the age of 18 living with them, 58.9% were married couples living together, 13.8% had a female householder with no husband present, and 21.0% were not families. About 16.5% of households were one person and 7.6% were one person aged 65 or older. The average household size was 3.1, and the average family size was 3.5.

The age distribution was 32.8% under  18, 9.3% from 18 to 24, 27.4% from 25 to 44, 19.6% from 45 to 64, and 11.0% 65 or older. The median age was 32 years. For every 100 females, there were 97.3 males. For every 100 females  18 and over, there were 94.1 males.

The median income for a household was $40,201 and for a family was $43,004. Males had a median income of $39,776 versus $25,665 for females. The per capita income for the city was $15,487. About 11.1% of families and 14.1% of the population were below the poverty line, including 18.2% of those under 18 and 6.4% of those 65 or over.

2010
At the 2010 census, Hesperia had a population of 90,173. The racial makeup of Hesperia was 55,129 (61.1%) White (41.1% non-Hispanic White), 5,226 (5.8%) African American, 1,118 (1.2%) Native American, 1,884 (2.1%) Asian, 270 (0.3%) Pacific Islander, 22,115 (24.5%) from other races, and 4,431 (4.9%) from two or more races. Hispanic or Latino of any race were 44,091 persons (48.9%).

The census reported that 90,145 people lived in households, 22 lived in noninstitutionalized group quarters, and six  were institutionalized.

Of the 26,431 households, 49.8% had children under the age of 18 living in them, 56.0% were opposite-sex married couples living together, 16.0% had a female householder with no husband present, 8.1% had a male householder with no wife present; 7.6% were unmarried opposite-sex partnerships, and 0.7% were same-sex married couples or partnerships. About 15.3% were one-person households and 6.3% had someone living alone who was 65 or older. The average household size was 3.41. The average family size was 3.76.

The age distribution was 29,156 people (32.3%) under 18, 9,465 people (10.5%) from 18 to 24, 23,243 people (25.8%) from 25 to 44, 20,157 people (22.4%) from 45 to 64, and 8,152 people (9.0%) 65 or older. The median age was 30.5 years. For every 100 females, there were 98.5 males. For every 100 females age 18 and over, there were 95.0 males.

The 29,004 housing units averaged 396.2 per square mile; of the occupied units, 17,688 (66.9%) were owner-occupied and 8,743 (33.1%) were rented. The homeowner vacancy rate was 3.6%; the rental vacancy rate was 8.4%; 58,320 people (64.7% of the population) lived in owner-occupied housing units and 31,825 people (35.3%) lived in rental housing units.

According to the 2010 United States Census, Hesperia had a median household income of $46,027, with 23.1% of the population living below the federal poverty line.

Economy
According to the city's 2020 Comprehensive Annual Financial Report, the principal employers in the city are:

Arts and culture

Hesperia has its own manmade lake (Hesperia Lake Park) on the southeastern edge of the town. This lake is where various town activities are held, including the annual Hesperia Day activities. Camping and fishing are permitted here, as well as day camp and various junior leagues for sports.

Just south of Hesperia Lake Park is the Radio Control Model Aircraft Park, located at 1700 Arrowhead Lake Road. Home of the Victor Valley R/C Flyers, the R/C Park is open on a daily basis by its members. Saturdays and Sundays are the best times to enjoy watching and flying radio-controlled miniature aircraft. Admission is free and the public is welcome.

Hesperia's golf course is known for its narrow fairways and fast greens. During the 1950s and 1960s, this course was a stop along the PGA Tour. The course runs from the rift between the "mesa" and the adjoining land on the other side.

To the east of Hesperia, the Mojave River runs from south to north, mainly under ground, and it surfaces in Victorville. Although the river bed is usually dry, it fills up if Hesperia experiences a rare heavy rain. Hesperia is bordered to the north by the city of Victorville, and to the east by the town of Apple Valley.

Hesperia is the home of Cal-Earth, a nonprofit organization demonstrating and teaching a method of home construction, particularly for arid hot areas, called Superadobe.

Parks and recreation
Hesperia Recreation and Park District serves the recreational needs of the citizens. Established in 1957, Hesperia Recreation and Park District has facilities, both indoors and outdoors. The Southern California Hardball Association is a 28 and over, adult baseball league that serves Hesperia residents.

Government

State and federal

Municipal
Cameron Gregg is the mayor of the city, with Brigit Bennington as the mayor pro tem. The other three council members are Larry Bird, Bill Holland, and Rebekah Swanson.

According to the city's 2010 Comprehensive Annual Financial Report, the city's various funds had $92.1 million in revenues, $98.7 million in expenditures, $520.5 million in total assets, $284.5 million in total liabilities, and $44.4 million in cash and investments.
The structure of the management and coordination of city services is:

Hesperia also has these advisory committees:  City Council Advisory Committee,  Planning Commission, and  Public Safety Advisory Committee composed of citizensassigned to provide advisory resources to the city council.

Discrimination lawsuits 
In 2016, the Victor Valley Family Resource Center sued Hesperia and the San Bernardino County Sheriff for closing transitional houses that the center operated in Hesperia. The center had operated houses in Hesperia for the homeless starting in 2012.  The suit alleged that after the center opened a house in January 2015 to provide housing for felons on probation, the city and sheriff discriminated illegally against the center's tenants and houses.

After a district judge issued a preliminary injunction against the city, the city council altered or repealed several of the laws in dispute. The suit was settled in April 2018 for $484,831.  On December 2, 2019, the United States Department of Justice filed suit against Hesperia and the San Bernardino County Sheriff's Department for "discrimination against residents and prospective residents of Hesperia because of race and national origin."

Education

The Hesperia Unified School District serves city. The district consists of three high schools (Hesperia High School, Sultana High School, Oak Hills High School), two continuation high schools (Mojave High and Canyon Ridge), three junior high schools (Hesperia Junior High, Ranchero Middle School, and Cedar Middle School), and 14 elementary schools.

Hesperia is also served by several charter and private schools. Mirus Secondary School is a 6-12 charter school in Hesperia with an independent study program. Hesperia is also served by Hesperia Christian School, founded in 1966 as a K-12 Christian School.

Infrastructure

Transportation
The city's main thoroughfares include Ranchero Road, Main Street, Eucalyptus Avenue, Bear Valley Road, Escondido Avenue, Maple Avenue, Cottonwood Avenue, 11th Avenue, 7th Avenue, 3rd Avenue, Hesperia Road, C Avenue, I Avenue, Peach Avenue, and Arrowhead Lake Road. Several of the major streets feature bike lanes and there are also several recreational trails within city limits. The city is located on Interstate 15, directly north of the Cajon Pass.

Public transit operations are controlled by the Victor Valley Transit Authority. BNSF Railway provides rail service through the city on a line which connects Los Angeles to Barstow and points east. Union Pacific freight trains and Amtrak’s Southwest Chief also pass through Hesperia on the BNSF line. The nearest Amtrak station is in Victorville, 13 miles north.

Public safety

The city of Hesperia contracts with the San Bernardino County Sheriff's Department for law-enforcement services. The new  substation—opened October 13, 2010—is located at 15840 Smoketree in the city's Civic Plaza, across the street from City Hall. The old  substation, which served for many years, was on Santa Fe Avenue next to the BNSF tracks. The station provides full-service law enforcement for the city and the southern suburbs of Oak Hills and Marianas Ranchos. Additional deputies can respond as necessary from the nearby Victorville Regional Station.

Shortly after Hesperia incorporated as a city in 1988, it created its own fire protection district, which lasted through 2004. The city now has a contract with the San Bernardino County Fire Department for fire and emergency medical services.

Notable people
 Dan Henderson, mixed martial arts (UFC) fighter
 Buck Page, musician, singer, founder of Riders of the Purple Sage band
 Marcel Reece, former fullback for the Oakland Raiders
 Chris Smith, coach and former Major League Baseball player
 Joe Stevenson, mixed martial arts fighter
 George Connor, retired Indy Car driver
 Dominick Reyes, mixed martial arts (UFC) fighter
 Lee Rodriguez, actress
 Thurston Smith, businessman and politician

References

External links

 
Cities in the Mojave Desert
Cities in San Bernardino County, California
Victor Valley
1988 establishments in California
Populated places established in 1988
Incorporated cities and towns in California